In New Zealand, a club skifield is a small ski resort run by a ski club to provide affordable skiing to its members. While members of the public can ski, members of the club receive heavily discounted rates, in exchange for a yearly membership fee and usually several days of voluntary work maintaining the resort.

List of club skifields in New Zealand
North Island
Manganui
Tukino
South Island
Broken River
Craigieburn Valley
Fox Peak
Mount Cheeseman
Temple Basin
Hanmer Springs Ski Area
Mount Olympus
Rainbow Ski Area
Awakino Ski Area

Former Club Fields
Porters Ski Area (previously "Porter Heights Ski Area") was formerly a club skifield, but is now run as a commercial operation. However, there is an active club associated that runs an alpine lodge.
Erewhon - The four rope tows were removed and it is now run as a backcountry area accessible only via helicopter. Now called Mount Potts.
Mount Hutt - now run as a commercial operation by NZSki, along with Coronet Peak and The Remarkables
Mount Robert closed in 2005, amalgamating with Rainbow Ski Area

See also
Skiing in New Zealand

References
Club fields of New Zealand
Intrepid & Club Skiing in New Zealand

Skiing in New Zealand